The Port Wine Museum is a museum located in Porto, Portugal. The museum recounts the history of port wine and its relevance to the city and the country.

History
The Port Wine Museum was founded in 2004. In March 2019, the Port Wine museum was transferred to the New Port Wine Museum on Rua Reboleira 37.

References 

Museums in Porto
Wine museums
Port wine